Mohammad Nami (Arabic: محمد نامي) is a Saudi Arabian retired professional footballer who played as a right-back. He played most of his career for Al-Ansar and Al-Hilal with a brief spell with Al-Fateh. He is a former Saudi Arabian international.

References 

Living people
1984 births
People from Medina
Association football fullbacks
Saudi Arabian footballers
Al-Ansar FC (Medina) players
Al Hilal SFC players
Al-Fateh SC players
Saudi First Division League players
Saudi Second Division players
Saudi Professional League players
Saudi Arabia international footballers
Saudi Arabian Shia Muslims